Church Basement Ladies is a musical comedy, book by Jim Stowell and Jessica Zuehlke, music and lyrics by Drew Jansen. The story is about the ladies that work in the church basement cooking meals for church functions, and is inspired by the humorous book Growing Up Lutheran, by Janet Letnes Martin and Suzann Nelson. Published in 1997, Growing Up Lutheran is a "scrapbook of memories" of what it was like to grow up Lutheran in the Midwest in the 1950s. In addition to their bestseller, Martin and Nelson, aka "Those Lutheran Ladies,"  have written numerous other works, including Growing Up Rural, published in 2017. Their lives and writings have inspired eight additional Church Basement Ladies musicals. The ninth sequel to the play, "The Church Basement Ladies Plowin' Thru" premiered at The Ames Center in Burnsville MN on September 7, 2022.

Cast

Original
 Mrs. Lars Snustad (Vivian) - Janet Paone
 Mrs. Gilmer Gilmerson (Mavis) - Greta Grosch
 Mrs. Elroy Engleson (Karin) - Dorian Chalmers
 Signe Engleson (Karin's Daughter) - Ruthie Baker
 Pastor E. L. Gunderson - Tim Drake
 Church Organist - Kyle Nelson

The show's 2009 national tour featured William Christopher as the pastor.

West Coast Premiere 
 Mrs. Lars Snustad (Vivian) - Cheryl Morrin
 Mrs. Gilmer Gilmerson (Mavis) - Sherri L. Jones
 Mrs. Elroy Engleson (Karin) - Sheri Shepard
 Signe Engleson (Karin's Daughter) - Christen Dugger
 Pastor E. L. Gunderson - Howard Wilson

Sequel Original Cast(s) 
 Mrs. Lars Snustad (Vivian) - Janet Paone (Sequel 2 and 4 through 9)
 Mrs. Lars Snustad (Vivian) - Roberta Mancina (Sequel 3)
 Mrs. Gilmer Gilmerson (Mavis) - Greta Grosch (Sequel 2 through 9)
 Mrs. Elroy Engleson (Karin) - Dorian Chalmers (Sequel 2 through 9)
 Pastor E. L. Gunderson - Tim Drake (Sequel 2 through 8)
 Beverly Signe Engleson - Tara Borman (Sequel 2 through 5 and 9)
 Beverly Signe Engleson - Bethany McCade (Sequel 7)
 Other original cast members: Peter Colburn (Sequel 6 and 7), Jeff March (Sequel 6), Michael Lee (Sequel 8), Greg Eiden (Sequel 9).

Plot
A celebration of the church basement kitchen and the women who work there, Church Basement Ladies is a musical comedy featuring four distinct characters and their relationships as they organize the food and solve the problems of a rural Minnesota church about to undergo changes in 1965. From the elderly matriarch of the kitchen to the young bride-to-be learning the proper order of things, we see them handle a record-breaking Christmas dinner, the funeral of a dear friend, a Hawaiian Easter fundraiser, and a steaming hot July wedding. They stave off potential disasters, share and debate recipes, instruct the young, and keep the Pastor on course while thoroughly enjoying, (and tolerating) each other as the true "steel magnolias" of the church. Funny and down to earth, audiences will recognize these ladies as they witness the church year unfold from below the house of God.

Act 1
Christmas DinnerWillie's Funeral

Act 2
Hawaiian Easter DinnerWedding

Songs

Act One
 Closer to Heaven (in the Church Basement) - Pastor and Company
 The Pale Food Polka - Karin and Ladies
 Get Down to Business - Karin and Ladies
 Song For Willie - Pastor and Ladies as Backup
 My Own Personal Island - Mavis
 Dead Spread - Ladies
 Closer to Heaven (Reprise) company

Act Two
 Get Down to Business (Reprise) Karin & Ladies
 The Cities - Vivian and Ladies
 This is Most Certainly True - Karin and Signe
 Sing a New Song - Signe and Ladies
 Mother of the Bride - Mavis and Ladies
 For Good - Vivian
 Sing a New Song (Reprise) - Company

Sequels
Church Basement Ladies (CBL) has spawned an entire series of musicals, with eight sequels and prequels to date.

 Church Basement Ladies 2: A Second Helping.  {the church in 1969} (Music and lyrics by Dennis Curley and Drew Jansen; book by Greta Grosch.) CBL 2 opened at the Plymouth Playhouse in Plymouth, Minnesota in March 2008, and at the New Theater in Overland Park, Kansas, in late summer 2009. The Kansas production featured Barry Williams as Pastor Gunderson. 
 Away in the Basement: A Church Basement Ladies Christmas. {the church in 1959} (Music and lyrics by Drew Jansen; book by Greta Grosch.) CBL 3 opened at the Plymouth Playhouse in November 2009.
 The Church Basement Ladies in "A Mighty Fortress Is Our Basement." {the church in 1960} (Music and lyrics by Drew Jansen; book by Greta Grosch.) CBL 4 opened at the Plymouth Playhouse in August 2011.
 The Church Basement Ladies in "The Last (Potluck) Supper."  {the church in 1979} (Music and lyrics by Drew Jansen; book by Greta Grosch.) CBL 5 opened at the Plymouth Playhouse in August 2013.
 The Church Basement Ladies in "Rise Up, O Men."  {the church in 1964} (Music and lyrics by Dennis Curley; additional lyrics by Greta Grosch; book by Greta Grosch; additional material by Graydon Royce.) CBL 6 opened at the Plymouth Playhouse in August 2016.
 The Church Basement Ladies in "You Smell Barn"  {ladies on their farms in the 1950s}  (Music by Dennis Curley; lyrics by Dennis Curley and Greta Grosch; book by Greta Grosch.) CBL 7 opened at the Ames Center in Burnsville, Minnesota on September 12, 2018.
 The Church Basement Ladies in "Hark! The Basement Ladies Sing"  {the church in 1960}  (Music and lyrics by Michael Pearce Donley; book by Greta Grosch ) CBL 8 opened at the Ames Center on November 1, 2019
 The Church Basement Ladies in "Plowin' Thru"  {the church in 1975}  (Music and lyrics by Dennis Curley; book by Greta Grosch ) CBL 9 opened at the Ames Center on September 7, 2022.

Production History
Produced by Troupe America Inc., Curt Wollan, Executive Producer, the first six musicals in the series opened at the Plymouth Playhouse in Plymouth, Minnesota. Installments 7, 8 and 9 opened at the Ames Center in Burnsville, Minnesota . 

In addition to touring nationally, the nine musicals have been licensed in all contiguous 48 states and Canada. More than four million audience members have attended the musical and its sequels. On November 18, 2016, the company celebrated its 3000th performance at the Plymouth Playhouse. Original Cast Recordings are available for Church Basement Ladies 1 through 7.

References

External links
 Church Basement Ladies at the official site.
 https://inthebasementproductions.com/
 Church Basement Ladies On Stage
https://www.troupeamerica.com/

Musicals based on novels
2005 musicals